The Blairmore Suburban Centre is a community service/commercial/residential community currently under development in western Saskatoon, Saskatchewan. It is part of the city's Blairmore Suburban Development Area, a large region annexed from the Rural Municipality of Corman Park No. 344 in 2005. Ultimately, the SDA will consist of seven new neighbourhoods, plus the Blairmore Suburban Centre, which is the first component of the SDA to be developed.

The suburban centre lies south of 22nd Street West, which is also Saskatchewan Highway 14. Saskatchewan Highway 7 forms the area's western boundary as it links to the site of a proposed interchange at 22nd Street; prior to 2012, however, the highway was temporarily aligned with Betts Avenue within the suburban centre until a new roadway was later constructed. The community also dovetails with the final phase of construction of the adjacent Parkridge community to the south. At present, the suburban centre consists of two high schools Tommy Douglas Collegiate and Bethlehem High School, plus a recreation/civic centre named Shaw Centre which opened the fall of 2008.; the three facilities are unique in Saskatoon as they are the first to be physically connected as one large building, allowing sharing of recreation amenities.

Recreation facilities
 Shaw Centre (formerly known as Blairmore Civic Centre) on Bowlt Crescent opened in the fall of 2008 and includes a track and 10, 7.5, 5, & 3 metre platform and springboard diving with 10 lane 50 metre competitive high performance swimming pool and 6 lane warm up pool It is physically connected to the area's two high schools.

Shopping
 A major big-box development is located west of Betts Avenue and south of 22nd Street, featuring a Wal-Mart and other retailers including Sally Beauty Supply, Bulk Barn, Jump.ca, Subway, Pennington's, Reitman, Sleep Country, and the Royal Bank.
 Additional strip-mall and hotel development exists east of Betts Avenue, as well. The hotels being built includes some of the first new accommodations to be constructed on the west side of the city in decades.
 Approximately  of retail is expected to be ultimately constructed in Blairmore SDA It is not known how much of this is earmarked for the Suburban Centre itself.
 The suburban centre is located a few kilometres west of the main 22nd Street commercial hub at Circle Drive.
 Hotels: Best Western Plus
 Additional retail is located off 22nd Street in adjacent Kensington.
There is a Boston Pizza, Dollorama, Staples, Rock Creek, and Wok Box

Government and politics
Blairmore Suburban Centre exists within the federal electoral district of Saskatoon West. It is currently represented by Brad Redekopp of the Conservative Party of Canada, first elected in 2019.

Provincially, the area is within the constituency of Saskatoon Fairview. It is currently represented by Vicki Mowat of the Saskatchewan New Democratic Party, who was elected in the September 7, 2017 Saskatoon Fairview bi-election.

In Saskatoon's non-partisan municipal politics, Blairmore Suburban Centre lies within ward 3. It is currently represented by Ann Iwanchuk, first elected in 2011.

Education 

The area's two high schools are connected together by way of the Shaw Centre recreation complex.
 Tommy Douglas Collegiate, public secondary school opened in the fall of 2007
 Bethlehem Catholic High School, Catholic/separate secondary school, opened in the fall of 2007.

Transportation 

22nd Street (Highway 14) is a major thoroughfare through Saskatoon  Highway 14 connects with Asquith, Biggar Wilkie, Unity, and Macklin en route to Alberta.

Much of the SC is being constructed on the former alignment of Highway 7; the highway wsd temporarily rerouted along Betts Avenue to Hwy 14/22nd Street. A permanent realignment, farther to the west, was put in place in 2012, with an interchange planned at the junction of Hwys 7 and 14.

City Transit

Public Transit to the area began on August 31, 2008.  Route 23 to Hampton Place runs Monday to Friday at a 30-minute frequency during peak hours, and a 60-minute frequency during midday hours.  There is no evening or weekend service.

References

External links 

  City of Saskatoon · Departments · Infrastructure Services ...
 The Wayward Reporter COUNCIL FLIP-FLOPS ON BIG-BOX RULES HAVE BUSINESS OWNERS WORRIED. WILL DOWNTOWN BECOME THE HOLE IN SASKATOON’S CENTENNIAL DONUT? by Jeremy Warren
 SASKATCHEWAN INVESTS $30 MILLION IN INNOVATIVE SASKATOON SCHOOL ...
 City moves ahead on Blairmore Site
 Learning #06-415 – SASKATCHEWAN INVESTS $30 MILLION IN INNOVATIVE ...
 City of Saskatoon City of Saskatoon · Departments · Community Services · City Planning · ZAM Maps
 Populace Spring 2006

Neighbourhoods in Saskatoon